The 2000 Maui Invitational Tournament was an early-season college basketball tournament that was played, for the 17th time, from November 20 to November 22, 2000. The tournament, which began in 1984, was part of the 2000–01 NCAA Division I men's basketball season.  The tournament was played at the Lahaina Civic Center in Maui, Hawaii and was won by the Arizona Wildcats. It was the first title for both the program and for its head coach Lute Olson after losses in the 1993 and 1997 finals.

Every school in the tournament except for Chaminade had participated in the NCAA tournament the year before.

Six of the twelve games were broadcast on ESPN or ESPN2.

Bracket

References

Maui Invitational
Maui
Maui